Cheung Shan may refer to the following hills in Hong Kong:

Cheung Shan (Kowloon), a hill within Ma On Shan Country Park
Cheung Shan (Lantau Island), a hill on Lantau Island

See also
 Cheung Shan Estate, a public housing estate in Tsuen Wan